Gabriel Loubier (born September 27, 1932) was a politician in Quebec, Canada. He served as leader of the Union Nationale party from 1971 to 1974, and as Leader of the Opposition in the National Assembly of Quebec from 1971 to 1973.

Born in Black Lake, Quebec, Loubier studied law at Laval University, and was admitted to the bar in 1958. He was first elected to the Quebec legislature representing Bellechasse in 1962 and served as Minister of Tourism and Fishing in the cabinets of Daniel Johnson and  Jean-Jacques Bertrand from 1966 to 1970 and also as Minister responsible for Youth and Sport from 1968 to 1970. Following the defeat of the Bertrand government in the 1970 provincial election, Loubier was a candidate in the June 1971 Union Nationale leadership convention defeating Marcel Masse on the third ballot to become party leader and leader of the Opposition. From October 25, 1971, to January 14, 1973, the Union Nationale temporarily changed its name to Unité Québec.

In the 1973 election, the Union Nationale was wiped off the electoral map, winning no seats, and Loubier ceased to be leader of the Opposition. He resigned as UN party leader in March 1974.

He served on the board of directors of Megantic Metal and several firms in the steel industry before inheriting control of the family firm, Loubier Metal, from his father in 1985.

References 
 

1932 births
Living people
Lawyers in Quebec
Union Nationale (Quebec) MNAs
Leaders of the Union Nationale (Quebec)
Université Laval alumni